Q clearance or Q access authorization is the U.S. Department of Energy (DOE) security clearance required to access Top Secret Restricted Data, Formerly Restricted Data, and National Security Information, as well as Secret Restricted Data. Restricted Data (RD) is defined in the Atomic Energy Act of 1954 and covers nuclear weapons and related materials. The lower-level L clearance is sufficient for access to Secret Formerly Restricted Data (FRD) and National Security Information, as well as Confidential Restricted Data, Formerly Restricted Data, and National Security Information. Access to Restricted Data is only granted on a need-to-know basis to personnel with appropriate clearances.

A Q Clearance is equivalent to a U.S. Department of Defense Top Secret clearance. "...the Q access authorization corresponds to the background investigation and administrative determination similar to what is completed by other agencies for a Top Secret National Security Information access clearance."

Anyone possessing an active Q clearance is always categorized as holding a National Security Critical-Sensitive position (sensitivity Level 3). Additionally, most Q-cleared incumbents will have collateral responsibilities designating them as Level 4: National Security Special-Sensitive personnel. With these two designations standing as the highest-risk sensitivity levels, occupants of these positions hold extraordinary accountability, having the potential to cause "exceptionally grave" or "inestimable" damage to the national security of the United States.
 

In addition to classification levels, three categories of classified matter are identified: Restricted Data (RD), Formerly Restricted Data (FRD), and National Security Information (NSI), as well as a class of access-restricted materials: special nuclear material (SNM). The employee must have a security level clearance consistent with their assignment. Common combinations are reflected in the table on the right.

Much of the DOE information at this level requires access to Critical Nuclear Weapon Design Information (CNWDI, pronounced "SIN-widee"). Such information bears the page marking Top Secret//RD-CNWDI and the paragraph marking (TS-N) or (TS//RD-CNWDI).  The DOE security clearance process is overseen by the Department of Energy Office of Hearings and Appeals.

DOE clearances apply for access specifically relating to atomic or nuclear related materials ("Restricted Data" under the Atomic Energy Act of 1954). The clearance is issued predominantly to non-military personnel. In 1946, U.S. Army Counter Intelligence Corps Major William L. Uanna, in his capacity as the first Chief of the Central Personnel Clearance Office at the newly formed Atomic Energy Commission, named and established the criteria for the Q Clearance. The security clearance process at the DOE is adjudicated by the DOE Office of Hearings and Appeals (OHA), where an individual whose security clearance is at issue may seek to appeal a security clearance decision to an administrative judge, and subsequently, to an appeal panel.

As of April 2021, there were 92,177 people who held a Q clearance.

In popular culture 
"Q" Clearance was a 1986 novel by Peter Benchley, satirizing Cold War secrecy and politics.

In "Nellis", episode 7 of season 6 of the television show Archer, Sterling Archer uses a Q clearance to gain access to Area 51 after landing illegally on the airstrip.

In Robert Heinlein's 1956 novel The Door Into Summer, the narrator says his pre-1960 Q clearance let him "soak up" much classified technology.

In the 2022 movie Moonfall actress Halle Barry who plays Jocinda Fowler is given Q clearance by the director of NASA (Albert Hutchings) who gives her his ID access badge once he determines that collision with the Moon is imminent.

In politics

The QAnon conspiracy theory is named such because the 4chan and 8chan poster, who in 2017 created the persona behind the conspiracy theory, claims to be an individual with Q level security clearance.

See also 
 Classified information in the United States

References

Nuclear weapons infrastructure of the United States
Nuclear secrecy
United States Department of Energy
United States government secrecy